The 1982 Wan Chai District Board election was held on 23 September to elect all 5 elected members to the 17-member Wan Chai District Board.

Overall election results

Results by constituency

Causeway Bay Central

Happy Valley

Tai Hang and So Kon Po

Wan Chai East

Wan Chai West

See also
 1982 Hong Kong local elections

References

1982 Hong Kong local elections
Wan Chai District Council elections